The Chartered Institution of Wastes Management (CIWM) is a professional body for the waste management industry in the United Kingdom and other countries. Based in Northampton, it has ten regional centres throughout England, Scotland, Wales, Northern Ireland and the Republic of Ireland, and is a member of the Society for the Environment. It awards the title of Chartered Waste Manager to qualifying members.

The objectives of the CIWM are to advance the scientific, technical and practical aspects of wastes and resource management for the safeguarding of the natural environment, to promote education, training, and research in wastes and resource management, and the dissemination of knowledge of the topic; and to strive to achieve and maintain the highest standards of best practice, technical competence and conduct by all its members.

The organisation was first established as the Association of Cleansing Superintendents of Great Britain on 25 June 1898, with waste managers from northern and Scottish cities, and was incorporated as the Institute of Cleansing Superintendents in 1908. It became the Institute of Public Cleansing in 1928, until 1981 when it was renamed to the Institute of Wastes Management. It was awarded a Royal Charter of Incorporation by Queen Elizabeth on 1 March 2002, and adopted its current name.

CIWM publishes the monthly CIWM Journal and the quarterly Municipal Vehicle Operator, and holds an annual joint conference with the Environmental Services Association in London.

See also
 Chartered Institution of Water and Environmental Management
 Waste Management Industry Training & Advisory Board
 List of organisations in the United Kingdom with a royal charter
 List of professional associations in the United Kingdom

External links 

Chartered Institution of Wastes Management

Wastes Management
Organisations based in England with royal patronage
Organisations based in Northamptonshire
Science and technology in Northamptonshire
Waste organizations